June 2015

See also

References

 06
June 2015 events in the United States